Saiful Muluk is a mountainous lake located at the northern end of the Kaghan Valley, near the town of Naran in the Saiful Muluk National Park. At an elevation of 3,224 m (10,578 feet) above sea level, the lake is located above the tree line, and is one of the highest lakes in Pakistan.

Location 

Malika Parbat, the highest peak in the valley is near the lake.

The lake is accessible from the nearby town of Naran during the summer season but access during winter is limited, as heavy snowfall and landslides threaten to cutoff the lake from other regions.

Physical features 
Saiful Muluk was formed by glacial moraines that blocked the water of the stream passing through the valley. The Kaghan Valley was formed in the greater  Pleistocene Period dating back almost 300,000 years when the area was covered with ice. Rising temperatures and receding glaciers left a large depression where glaciers once stood. Melting water collected into the lake.

Ecology 
The lake has rich eco-diversity and holds many species of blue-green algae. Large brown trout are found in the lake, up to about seven kilograms. About 26 species of vascular plant exist in the area, with Asteraceae the most commonly found species. Other species commonly found in the region are: Ranunculaceae, Compositae, Cruciferae, Gramineae, Apiaceae, Leguminosae, Scrophulariaceae and Polygonaceae.

Folklore 

The Lake Saiful Muluk is named after a legendary prince. A fairy tale called Saif-ul-Muluk, written by the Sufi poet Mian Muhammad Bakhsh, talks of the lake. It tells the story of the Egyptian Prince Saiful Malook who fell in love with a fairy princess named Princess Badri-ul-Jamala at the lake.

Gallery
Hover the mouse click or tap on the following images to see their captions.

See also
Lulusar Lake
Katora Lake
Dudipatsar Lake
Mahodand Lake
Ratti Gali Lake

References

External links

About Saiful Malook Lake
PTDC Official website
Kaghan Valley & Lake Saiful Muluk - Pictures
Full text of the fairytale associated with the lake.

Saiful Muluk
Pakistani folklore